Burnley F.C. Academy are the youth teams of Burnley Football Club. The under-21s currently play in the second level of reserve football in England, the under-21 Professional Development League. The team mainly consists of players under the age of 21 at the club, but does occasionally include first team players. Burnley's under-18s currently play in the second level of academy football in England, the U18 Professional Development League.

U21 squad

U18 Squad

Honours 
The list below includes honours won by either Burnley's "A", "B", reserves, under-23s, or under-21s teams.

League 
The Central League
 Winners: 1948–49, 1961–62, 1962–63
 Runners–up: 1950–51, 1953–54
The Central League Division Two (third tier)
 Winners: 1997–98
West Division
 Winners: 2008–09
Lancashire League Division One
 Winners: 1952–53, 1956–57, 1960–61, 1961–62, 1993–94
Lancashire League Division Two
 Winners: 1955–56, 1977–78, 1978–79, 1980–81
Lancashire Combination Division Two
 Winners: 1954–55
 Runners–up: 1907–08
West Lancashire Football League Division One
 Winners: 1927–28, 1938–39, 1949–50
North East Lancashire League
 Winners: 1892–93, 1893–94
 Runners–up: 1890–91, 1891–92

Cup 
FA Youth Cup
 Winners: 1967–68
Central League Cup (North)
 Winners: 2015–16
Lancashire Senior Cup
 Winners: (12) 1889–90, 1914–15, 1949–50, 1951–52, 1959–60, 1960–61, 1961–62, 1964–65, 1965–66, 1969–70, 1971–72, 1992–93

Graduates
Below is a list of Burnley youth players that have gone on to play in the first team since 1936.

Players that have been capped at full international level are in bold.

References

External links
Official Burnley F.C. website

Burnley F.C.
Football academies in England
Lancashire League (football)
Lancashire Combination
West Lancashire Football League